Anthony Frank Hawk (born May 12, 1968), nicknamed Birdman, is an American professional skateboarder, entrepreneur, and the owner of the skateboard company Birdhouse. A pioneer of modern vertical skateboarding, Hawk completed the first documented "900" skateboarding trick in 1999. He also licensed a skateboarding video game series named after him published by Activision that same year. He retired from competing professionally in 2003 and is regarded as one of the most influential skateboarders of all time.

Hawk has been involved in various philanthropic activities throughout his career, and is the founder of the Tony Hawk Foundation (now named The Skatepark Project), which helps to build skateparks in underprivileged areas around the world.

Early life
Tony Hawk was born on May 12, 1968, in San Diego, California, to Nancy (1924–2019) and Frank Peter Rupert Hawk, and was raised in San Diego. He has two older sisters, Pat and Lenore, and an older brother, Steve.

As a child, Hawk was described as "hyperactive", and his mother stated that he was "so hard on himself and expected himself to do so many things." One time, Hawk struck out in baseball and was so distraught that he hid in a ravine and had to be "physically coaxed out" by his father. His frustration with himself was so harsh that his parents had him psychologically evaluated at school. The results were that Tony was "gifted", as he was tested with an IQ of 144, so school advisers recommended placing him in advanced classes. Hawk attended Jean Farb Middle School from 1980 to 1981. His parents supported his skateboarding because it served as an outlet for his excessive energy. Hawk's skills developed, and he made his television debut on Captain Kangaroo as "Skateboard Johnny" in 1981. He became a professional skateboarder at age 14. By age 16, Hawk was sponsored by Powell Peralta, Tracker, Sundek, Vans, and SIO.  He was officially the National Skateboard Association world champion for 12 consecutive years.

Hawk attended three high schools and graduated from Torrey Pines High School in 1986. He listed Steve Caballero and Christian Hosoi as his influences at the time.

Career

Skateboarding

With the money he made from skateboarding, he bought his first house during his senior year in high school.
On June 27, 1999, Hawk became the first skateboarder to land a "900", a trick involving the completion of two-and-a-half mid-air revolutions on a skateboard, in which he was successful on his twelfth attempt. After completing the trick, Hawk said "This is the best day of my life." Following this feat, Hawk decided to retire from professional competition that same year, but he continued to perform at the annual X Games until 2003, when he retired from professional competition for good. In 2011, Hawk was still able to land the trick and posted a video on his Twitter account stating, "I'm 43 and I did a 900 today." On June 27, 2016, at age 48, Hawk performed what he claimed would be his final 900. In a video posted on the YouTube channel RIDE Channel, Hawk said, "Spencer was there on my first one, and now he was there on my last", after successfully landing a 900.

Hawk was invited to US president Barack Obama's June 2009 Father's Day celebration and skated in the hallways of the nearby Old Executive Office Building on the White House grounds. This marked the first time ever someone skateboarded on the White House grounds with permission from officials. In 2009, Hawk was inducted into the Skateboarding Hall of Fame at its inaugural ceremony.

As of April 2020, Hawk is sponsored by Birdhouse, Vans, Independent, Bones, and Nixon. His current Pro model shoe is the Proto. Hawk was formerly sponsored by Theeve. Following an invitation from his former sponsor, Quiksilver, Hawk assembled a group of vert skateboarders to perform, in 2012, the first-ever vert demonstration to have occurred in India. While in India, the group visited Mahatma Gandhi's house, where the skateboarders were greeted by a very excited young audience and the 540-degree maneuver was executed during the skateboarding demonstration—the Indian trip was published on Hawk's RIDE YouTube channel on February 4, 2013.

In July 2021, Hawk briefly ended his competitive retirement to participate in the Vert Best Trick event at that year's X Games, finishing in fourth place out of nine competitors.

Contest victories

Video game series

A video game series based on Hawk's skateboarding, titled Tony Hawk's Pro Skater, debuted in 1999. Since then, the series has spawned 18 titles so far, including ten main-series titles, four spin-offs, and four repackages.

Hawk's role in the series was usurped by customizable player characters in later installments, but he has remained a prominent character. In the fifth game in the series, Underground, he is a minor non-player character whom the player meets in Tampa, Florida, and skates against. Impressed with the player's skills, Hawk grants them entry into a skate competition. He later appears in Moscow to teach them the "360 Varial Heelflip Lien" move. Hawk and other skaters are briefly playable near the end of the game when they skate in a promotional video for the player's skate team, and in all gameplay modes except the story mode. He appeared as a kid in the Backyard Sports series Backyard Skateboarding.

Film and television
In 1986, Hawk was a featured skateboarder and skater-double for Josh Brolin in the movie Thrashin'. In 1987, he made a brief appearance in the movie Police Academy 4: Citizens on Patrol with David Spade. In 1989, he appeared as a skateboarder in Gleaming the Cube. In 2002, he appeared in Neal H. Moritzs's and Christopher Gilcrest's film xXx playing the role of one of Xander Cage's stuntman friends, and later in the movie, a skateboarder at a party. In 2004, he played himself in the Australian skateboarding movie Deck Dogz. In 2006, he made a cameo on the film Drake & Josh Go Hollywood as himself. Hawk also had a cameo in the movie The New Guy, and appeared in Jackass: The Movie with Mat Hoffman and Bam Margera, skateboarding in a fat suit and Jackass Number Two, while skateboarding through an obstacle course. He was also in Jackass 3D. Hawk appeared in the film following the 2006 Gumball Rally, 3000 Miles, again with Bam Margera. He also played the police officer who arrests Ryan Dunn in the movie Haggard: The Movie. Hawk also made a brief cameo appearance in Lords of Dogtown as an astronaut, where he is shown comically falling off the skateboard as he is a "rookie". He voiced himself in the 2006 animated movie Tony Hawk in Boom Boom Sabotage, where he is kidnapped by circus freaks.

Hawk was featured as an extra in the "Weird Al" Yankovic video "Smells Like Nirvana". He can be seen sitting in the bleachers during the crowd sweep near Dick Van Patten. He also made a cameo appearance in the Simple Plan music video for "I'm Just a Kid", he can be seen, in a crowd, at a high school, watching kids skating.

On television, he appeared in Action, What I Like About You, The Suite Life of Zack & Cody, The Tom Green Show, The Naked Brothers Band, Zeke and Luther, Viva La Bam, and All That. Hawk was a guest on the Nickelodeon kid's show Yo Gabba Gabba!. In 2000, he played himself in Max Steel. He also guest voiced on The Simpsons episode "Barting Over", where he played himself, along with fellow San Diegans Blink-182. In the episode, Hawk lends Homer a new board from his brand where complete rookies are able to perform at the top levels. He ends up having a comical play off with him after Homer begins to show him up. Tony Hawk appeared as himself in MXC in a special "MXC Almost Live" episode in 2004. On the PBS Kids show Cyberchase, he guest-starred as Slider's long-lost father Coop. In the CSI: Miami episode "Game Over" he played a game programmer who was murdered. In 2008, he played on Million Dollar Password. Hawk also played on Fox's Are You Smarter Than a 5th Grader?. Hawk hosted Cartoon Network's "Hall of Game" sports award show on February 25, 2011. Hawk was on Take Two With Phineas and Ferb. Hawk appeared on the internet cooking show Epic Meal Time on October 28, 2011, to celebrate the show's one-year anniversary, where he can be seen in the final scene eating a deep-fried pizza cake. Hawk reappeared on another Epic Meal Time video on July 20, 2013, as a guest on the educational cooking show Handle It. Hawk assisted Harley Morenstein (Sauce Boss) in cooking egg rolls. The video features promotion for Hawk's own YouTube channel, RIDE Channel. He also guest-starred on the ABC comedy Last Man Standing. He played himself in an episode of Rocket Power.

Hawk appeared in the TV series Breaking In, The High Fructose Adventures of Annoying Orange, The Cleveland Show, Sesame Street, and So Random!. Hawk appeared in the movie Parental Guidance as himself. In 2013, he and Eric Koston appeared as reporters in an episode of The Aquabats! Super Show!, another series by Yo Gabba Gabba! creator and longtime friend of Hawk's, Christian Jacobs. He also appeared in Disney's Zeke and Luther as himself. In 2015, Hawk acted as a stunt double for Will Ferrell during a skateboarding scene in the film Daddy's Home. Hawk sustained an injury that required 10 stitches in his leg while filming the scene.

He competed in the 2020 third season of The Masked Singer as "Elephant". He was the first of Group B to be eliminated.

In 2022, Hawk did a guest voice role in The Casagrandes episode "Skaters Gonna Hate" where it was revealed that he had a history with Carlos Casagrande back when he operated as "Carlos X"; that same year, HBO released a documentary on him entitled Tony Hawk: Until the Wheels Fall Off.

Other ventures
Boom Boom HuckJam
In 2002, Hawk started a show tour featuring freestyle motocross, skateboarding, and BMX. It started in Las Vegas and went on to 31 cities around the U.S. and eventually to Six Flags amusement parks.

Amusement park rides
A series of amusement park rides known as Tony Hawk's Big Spin were built in three Six Flags parks in 2007 and 2008. The ride was originally billed as the "Tony Hawk experience" and was designed to have the look and feel of a giant red-and-black skatepark. It offered a full "extreme sports" experience, with monitors in the queue lines displaying highlights of the history of action sports and a large spinning Tony Hawk figure crowning the ride. In 2010 Six Flags cancelled its license and the rides were renamed to Pandemonium. The ride at Six Flags Discovery Kingdom was moved to Six Flags Mexico in 2012 to make way for a new ride known as Superman: Ultimate Flight. Additionally, a water park ride called Tony Hawk's Half pipe (renamed The Half pipe in 2011) was opened at Six Flags America in Bowie, Maryland.

RIDE Channel
In January 2012, Hawk launched the YouTube channel "RIDE Channel". In the welcome video, Hawk explained:

... I'm proud to announce the launch of our new YouTube channel—it's called "RIDE." I've teamed up with some of the best people in the skate industry; we are rolling out over twenty-two different shows over the course of the year. Shows like, "Hand in Hand," which basically features different successful musicians and artists and people from all walks of life who have been inspired by skating ... this is something we've always wanted to, and it's finally a reality, and it's here on YouTube...

As part of the RIDE Channel, a show called "Tony's Strange Life" features Hawk interviewing a variety of people, not just skateboarding figures, skits in which Hawk appears, and footage of Hawk skateboarding, including skateboarding footage from the floor of the New York Stock Exchange (NYSE). The predecessor of RIDE Channel was a now-defunct website, entitled Shred or Die, which was similar, with the show, Free Lunch, carried across to the new venture.

Emoji
In February 2018, New York magazine reported that Hawk was working with Jeremy Burge to help design Emojipedia's skateboard emoji after the company's initial design was criticized by Hawk as "a skateboard you would buy at a department store in the '80s." The updated design was based on Hawk's own skateboard. Subsequent releases of the skateboard emoji from Apple and Samsung resemble Hawk's board (including 60mm wheels) despite no direct collaboration between Hawk and these companies.

Image and legacy

In December 2011, Hawk was identified by Transworld Skateboarding magazine as the second most influential skateboarder of all time after Mark Gonzales for the invention of the Backside Ollie to tail.

In January 2013, professional skateboarder John Cardiel, identified by Transworld Skateboarding as the eleventh most influential skateboarder of all time, listed Hawk as one of his personal all-time skateboarding influences, alongside Gonzales, Christian Hosoi, and Sacramento's skateboarders. Cardiel explained, "... the insane 540s with no hands, and, just like, all his tricks; he had the ramps, all his ramps, all the ramps he had—I thought that was insane. Tony Hawk's the best."

In an interview for the online series Free Lunch, produced by Hawk's RIDE Channel, professional skateboarder Andrew Reynolds stated:

... and then Tony's just, like, Tony Hawk—he's like, basically, to me it says, "You can be a skater and take over everything and be, you know ... and use skateboarding to be ... a businessman, a ... role model to young people," um, he's just the best. And, he called my house when I was fifteen, and was, like, "Do you wanna do something with us?" not knowing anything about me. Yeah, Tony's the man, sure, he's the best.

In 2012, Reynolds recruited Hawk's son Riley to his skateboard deck company, Baker, explaining:

... I was just, kinda like, "it's kinda touchy, you know what I mean, like?" It's kinda weird, you know? Tony's kid, he rides for Birdhouse. But I look at it, like, I picture him on Baker, you know what I mean? So we just approached Tony, "Yeah, we wanna talk to Riley about maybe gettin' some Baker boards, or something like that." And Tony's like, "Man, he's rippin', he's nineteen years old, he can, you know, it's really up to him. You guys talk to him, you know?" So we just kinda said, "You wanna get some boards?" He's like, "I'm down, man!" And I look at it, like, there would be no Baker without Tony and Birdhouse. I know it's an ongoing process, you know? Tony quits to start Birdhouse; I quit to start Baker; my guys quit to start a new brand, you know? It's just an ongoing thing.

Hawk often posts on Twitter about encounters with people who do not recognize him or wonder if he is really Tony Hawk. Some of these tweets have gone viral, and misidentifying him became a running joke among fans.

Personal life

In April 1990, Hawk married Cindy Dunbar, whom he began dating in high school. Their son, Riley Hawk, was born on December 6, 1992, and was named after one of Hawk's ancestors. Riley is also a professional skateboarder. Hawk and Dunbar divorced in 1993.

Hawk was married to Erin Lee from 1996 to 2004. They have two kids, born 1999 and 2001. The older of the two, Spencer, is an electronic music producer who releases music as Gupi.

Hawk was married to Lhotse Merriam from 2006 to 2011. Their wedding was held in Fiji and Rancid played for them as the wedding's band. The couple's only child was born in 2008.

Hawk married his fourth wife, Cathy Goodman, on June 27, 2015, in a ceremony in Limerick, Ireland.

Philanthropy

Hawk created the Tony Hawk Foundation in 2002 in response to the lack of safe and legal skateparks in America. As of June 2018, his foundation has awarded US$5.8 million, aiding 596 skatepark projects. In 2015, the foundation received the Robert Wood Johnson Sports award, which honors recipients for their innovative and influential approaches to using sports to build a culture of health in their communities. In 2007, Hawk, Andre Agassi, Muhammad Ali, Lance Armstrong, Warrick Dunn, Jeff Gordon, Mia Hamm, Andrea Jaeger, Jackie Joyner-Kersee, Mario Lemieux, Alonzo Mourning, and Cal Ripken Jr. founded the charity Athletes for Hope, an organization that aims to inspire all people to volunteer and support their communities through the actions of professional athletes. In 2020, the Tony Hawk Foundation changed its name to The Skatepark Project to better describe the organization's mission.

In 2023, Hawk auctioned a signed photograph of himself and Rick Thorne, with 50% of the proceeds to be donated to the Tyre Nichols Memorial Fund. The fund was created following the death of Tyre Nichols at the hands of law enforcement officers. One of the fund's plans involve building a skate park in Nichols' honor.

Filmography

Videos

Bibliography

References

External links

 
 

 
1968 births
Living people
20th-century American businesspeople
20th-century American male actors
21st-century American businesspeople
21st-century American male actors
American male film actors
American male television actors
American male video game actors
American male voice actors
American philanthropists
American skateboarders
Businesspeople from San Diego
Male actors from California
Male actors from San Diego
People from San Diego
Sportspeople from Carlsbad, California
Sportspeople from San Diego
X Games athletes